Dirk Rijnders (born 8 March 1909 in Harderwijk, Gelderland – died 7 November 2006 in Eindhoven) was a Dutch politician of the Christian Historical Union (CHU) and its successor the Christian Democratic Appeal (CDA).

Rijnders was mayor of several municipalities, among others Amstelveen. He was also a member of the States of North Holland and the Senate.

1909 births
2006 deaths
Christian Historical Union politicians
20th-century Dutch politicians
Christian Democratic Appeal politicians
Mayors in South Holland
Mayors of Amstelveen
Members of the Provincial Council of North Holland
Members of the Senate (Netherlands)
People from Harderwijk